The men's road race at the 1938 UCI Road World Championships was the 12th edition of the event. The race took place on Sunday 4 September 1938 in Valkenburg, the Netherlands. The race was won by Marcel Kint of Belgium.

Final classification

References

Men's Road Race
UCI Road World Championships – Men's road race